Matías Jesús Córdoba (born 7 October 1984 in Lanús) is a retired Argentine football midfielder who formerly plays for some clubs, such as Argentinos Juniors, Real Salt Lake, Perth Glory F.C., Penang FA, and PS Barito Putera in his football careers.

Career

Córdoba was formed in the storied youth ranks of Argentinos Juniors. He made his debut in the Primera Division Argentina with Argentinos Juniors in a 1–0 victory over Rosario Central on June 10, 2005. After spending three seasons at the club he was loaned to Club Atlético Tigre in 2007. Once his loan spell concluded, Argentinos Juniors loaned him out to MLS side Real Salt Lake.

Córdoba was later loaned to Quilmes on 2009, Monagas and San Martín de Tucumán on 2010 and currently he is loaned on the club Atlante F.C. of Mexico.

Gabala FK 
At the beginning January 2013, Córdoba had a trial with Gabala of the Azerbaijan Premier League., which he cut short in order to sign with A-League team Perth Glory FC.

Perth Glory FC 
On 8 March 2013, Cordoba scored his first goal for Glory, placing his shot across the keeper from outside the penalty box as Glory won 2–1 at the Newcastle Jets

Oriente Petrolero, Deportes Naval, Club Atlético Brown, Alianza F.C. 
After left Perth Glory FC Cordoba had a brief stint with  Oriente Petrolero, Deportes Naval, Club Atlético Brown, Alianza F.C., before signing permanently for Penang FA to play in Malaysia.

Penang FA 
In November 2015, Cordoba signs for Malaysian side Penang FA, a professional association football club currently plays in the top division of Malaysian football, the Malaysia Super League. After a season with Penang FA, he parted ways after won the battle of relegation to stay top flight the following season.

Barito Putra 
In early 2017, Cordoba signs for Indonesian side PS Barito Putera, Indonesian football club based in Banjarmasin, South Kalimantan, he's scored 4 goals and give 4 assists for team in season.

References

External links
 
 
 

1984 births
Living people
Sportspeople from Lanús
Argentine footballers
Argentine expatriate footballers
Argentinos Juniors footballers
Club Atlético Tigre footballers
Quilmes Atlético Club footballers
Real Salt Lake players
Monagas S.C. players
Deportes La Serena footballers
Naval de Talcahuano footballers
San Martín de Tucumán footballers
Atlante F.C. footballers
Primera B de Chile players
Chilean Primera División players
Argentine Primera División players
Liga MX players
Major League Soccer players
Perth Glory FC players
A-League Men players
Expatriate footballers in Chile
Expatriate footballers in Mexico
Expatriate footballers in Venezuela
Expatriate soccer players in the United States
Expatriate soccer players in Australia
Expatriate footballers in El Salvador
Association football midfielders